The Hills is a village in Travis County, Texas, United States. The population was 2,613 at the 2020 census, making it the largest village in Texas. It is a suburb of Austin.

Geography

The Hills is located at  (30.346938, –97.981187), 16 miles (26 km) west of downtown Austin.

According to the United States Census Bureau, the village has a total area of 1.1 square miles (2.8 km2), all of it land.

Demographics

As of the 2020 United States census, there were 2,613 people, 1,012 households, and 821 families residing in the village.

As of the census of 2000, there were 1,492 people, 585 households, and 503 families residing in the village. The population density was 1,400.6 people per square mile (538.4/km2). There were 657 housing units at an average density of 616.7/sq mi (237.1/km2). The racial makeup of the village was 97.18% White, 1.21% African American, 0.34% Native American, 0.67% Asian, 0.13% from other races, and 0.47% from two or more races. Hispanic or Latino of any race were 2.21% of the population.

There were 585 households, out of which 30.4% had children under the age of 18 living with them, 82.1% were married couples living together, 2.1% had a female householder with no husband present, and 14.0% were non-families. 12.6% of all households were made up of individuals, and 5.8% had someone living alone who was 65 years of age or older. The average household size was 2.55 and the average family size was 2.77.

In the village, the population was spread out, with 22.7% under the age of 18, 3.2% from 18 to 24, 22.5% from 25 to 44, 33.0% from 45 to 64, and 18.6% who were 65 years of age or older. The median age was 46 years. For every 100 females, there were 100.5 males. For every 100 females age 18 and over, there were 97.6 males.

The median income for a household in the village was $114,861, and the median income for a family was $126,252. Males had a median income of $100,000 versus $41,964 for females. The per capita income for the village was $61,363. About 2.8% of families and 2.7% of the population were below the poverty line, including 2.6% of those under age 18 and 2.5% of those age 65 or over.

Politics

The village of The Hills has supported all six GOP presidential campaigns since its date of incorporation.

Education
The Lake Travis Independent School District serves village students. Lakeway Elementary School in Lakeway, Hudson Bend Middle School in an unincorporated area, and Lake Travis High School in an unincorporated area serve The Hills.

Public library
The Lake Travis Community Library (LTCL) in Lakeway serves The Hills. It originally opened in Lake Travis High School in 1985. Area voters approved the creation of the library district serving the library was created in May 2004. Haythem Dawlett donated the land for the library in March 2011, and the library moved into the current location in February 2013.

References

External links
 Village of The Hills website

Villages in Travis County, Texas
Villages in Texas
Greater Austin